Teale is a surname and a given name, and may refer to:

Surname
 Edwin Way Teale (1899–1980), American naturalist, photographer and Pulitzer Prize-winning writer
 Fred H. Teale, Los Angeles City Auditor from 1892 until 1896
 Gary Teale (born 1978), Scottish footballer and manager
 Leanne Teale (Karla Homolka, born 1970), Canadian woman convicted of manslaughter in 1993
 Leonard Teale (1922-1994), Australian actor
 Matt Teale (born 1975), British broadcast journalist and newsreader
 Owen Teale (born 1961), Welsh actor
 Shaun Teale (born 1964), English retired footballer and manager
 Thomas Pridgin Teale (died 1867) (1800-1867), British surgeon 
 Thomas Pridgin Teale (died 1923) (1831-1923), British surgeon, son of the above

Given name
 Teale Orban, Canadian former football quarterback
 Teale Jakubenko, a top 12 finalist in Australian Idol (season 6)
 Teale Coco Australian Model and fashion designer

See also
 Teal (disambiguation)
 Thiele (disambiguation)